John Socha-Leialoha (born 1958) is a software developer best known for creating Norton Commander, the first orthodox file manager.  The original Norton Commander was written for DOS.  Over the years, Socha's design for file management has been extended and cloned many times.

John grew up in the woods of Wisconsin, earned a BS degree in Electrical Engineering from University of Wisconsin–Madison, and his PhD in Applied Physics from Cornell University. He now lives in Bellevue, Washington with his wife. His son, John Avi, is a graduate of the University of Washington.

Starting in September 2010, John began working at Microsoft officially.

Independent work
In the early days of the IBM PC, John Socha wrote a column for the now defunct magazine Softalk, where he published such programs as ScrnSave, KbdBuffer (extending the keyboard buffer), and Whereis (finding files on a hard disk).

ScrnSave was the first screensaver ever created. John Socha also coined the term screen saver.  The built-in screensaver (night sky with stars) was one of the most distinctive features of Norton Commander, along with the two-panel blue screen.

When Peter Norton Computing was acquired by Symantec in 1990, John Socha left to found his own company, Socha Computing Inc. The new company developed the Microsoft Plus! add-on pack for Windows 95, and also developed screensavers for Windows 98. In July 1997 Socha Computing was acquired by Asymetrix.

Since October 2003, John has devoted himself to his long-standing hobby of model railroading. He is co-founder of New Rail Models.

In December 2004, John Socha co-authored Optimize Your Pocket PC Development with the .NET Compact Framework for MSDN Magazine.

Norton Commander

John Socha continued work on his VDOS program after joining Peter Norton Computing as their first director of research and development. In 1986 the software product was released under the name of Norton Commander.

Socha also led the development team of Norton Utilities for the Macintosh computer platform.

John has written a number of technical books published under the Peter Norton name, including the best-selling Peter Norton's Assembly Language Book.

Other work
John has many other projects including controllers for train models and mobile application design.

John maintains a YouTube channel on which he discusses small scale CNC machining and injection molding fabrication techniques.

John is a private pilot and owns Daisy, a plane featured in books by Richard Bach.

References

  Nikolai Bezroukov (2005). The History of Development of Norton Commander (NC line of OFMs)
 Co-authored Teach Yourself... Visual Basic 5 for MIS Press with Dan Rahmel and Devra Hall.

External links
John Socha-Leialoha's Blog
John Socha-Leialoha blog at Microsoft

1958 births
Living people
Computer programmers
 University of Wisconsin–Madison College of Engineering alumni
Cornell University alumni